Viktor Sakhniuk (born 4 June 1990) is a Ukrainian football forward who plays for FC Trostianets.

FK Dukla Banská Bystrica
He made his full professional debut for Dukla Banská Bystrica on 16 September 2012 against Žilina. The match ended in a 2–2 draw.

References

External links
MFK Ružomberok profile

1990 births
Living people
Sportspeople from Kyiv
Ukrainian footballers
Ukrainian expatriate footballers
Ukraine youth international footballers
Association football forwards
MFK Ružomberok players
FK Dukla Banská Bystrica players
MFK Tatran Liptovský Mikuláš players
Slovak Super Liga players
2. Liga (Slovakia) players
Stal Gorzyce players
SC Tavriya Simferopol players
FC Bukovyna Chernivtsi players
FC Enerhiya Nova Kakhovka players
FC Dnipro Cherkasy players
FC Trostianets players
Ukrainian First League players
Armenian First League players
Expatriate footballers in Slovakia
Ukrainian expatriate sportspeople in Slovakia
Expatriate footballers in Armenia
Ukrainian expatriate sportspeople in Armenia
Expatriate footballers in Poland
Ukrainian expatriate sportspeople in Poland